Frank D. Thompson (April 9, 1876 – June 12, 1940) was a Vermont attorney and judge.  He is most notable for his service as an associate justice of the Vermont Supreme Court from 1929 to 1937.

Early life
Frank Dutton Thompson was born in Irasburg, Vermont on April 9, 1876, the son of Laforrest H. Thompson and Mary Eliza (Dutton) Thompson.  Laforrest Thompson was a prominent lawyer, politician and judge, and he served as President of the Vermont Senate and an associate justice of the Vermont Supreme Court.

Frank Thompson graduated from St. Johnsbury Academy in 1894, and attended the University of Vermont from 1894 to 1895.  He then studied law with Wendell Phillips Stafford, after which he enrolled at Boston University School of Law, from which he graduated with an LL.B. degree in 1899.  After attaining admission to the bar in 1899, Thompson practiced law in St. Johnsbury, Vermont until moving to Barton in 1906.

Political career
A Republican, Thompson became active in local and state politics.  He served as state's attorney for Caledonia County from 1904 to 1906.  After moving to Barton, he served as judge of the Orleans County municipal court from 1910 to 1915.  Thompson was a candidate for the Republican nomination for the United States House of Representatives from Vermont's 2nd congressional district in 1912, but withdrew before the nominating convention in favor of incumbent Frank Plumley, who was renominated and reelected.  He was a Theodore Roosevelt delegate to the 1912 Republican National Convention, but declined to support the Progressive Party after the convention and switched his backing to the incumbent president, William Howard Taft.  In addition to service as a village trustee and village attorney, Thompson became active in several businesses, including service on the board of directors of the Barton Savings Bank and Trust Company and Barton's Marl Products Company.

Thompson served on the Vermont Board of Bar Examiners from 1916 to 1919.  In 1918 he was an unsuccessful candidate for the Republican nomination for state's attorney of Orleans County. When the incumbent died, Thompson was appointed to fill the vacancy, and he served until 1921.  From 1919 until 1923, Thompson served as reporter of decisions for the Vermont Supreme Court.  In 1920, he ran unsuccessfully for the Republican nomination to represent Barton in the Vermont House of Representatives.  He won the seat in 1922, and was serving in 1923 when he was selected for a judgeship.

Judicial career
In 1923, Thompson was appointed as a judge of the Vermont Superior Court.  He advanced through seniority to become the chief judge, and continued to serve until 1929.  In December 1929, he was named an associate justice of the Vermont Supreme Court, succeeding George M. Powers, who had been promoted to chief justice.  Thompson held this position until retiring in 1937 because of ill health, and was succeeded by John S. Buttles.

Honors
In 1934, Thompson received the honorary degree of LL.D. from the University of Vermont.

Death and burial
In retirement, Thompson was a resident of Barton.  He died in Barton on June 12, 1940.  He was buried at Welcome O. Brown Cemetery in Barton.

Family
In 1900, Thompson married Mabel Miles, the daughter of Willard W. Miles, who served as an associate justice of the Vermont Supreme Court. They had no children.

References

Sources

Newspapers

Books

1876 births
1940 deaths
People from St. Johnsbury, Vermont
People from Barton, Vermont
Boston University School of Law alumni
Vermont lawyers
Republican Party members of the Vermont House of Representatives
State's attorneys in Vermont
Justices of the Vermont Supreme Court
Burials in Vermont